Sergey Vasilyevich Andreyev (born 16 May 1956 in Luhansk) is a football manager and a former Soviet and Russian player.

Honors
 Olympic bronze: 1980.
 Olympic tournament top scorer: 1980, 5 goals.
 Soviet Cup winner: 1981.
 Soviet Top League top scorer: 1980 (20 goals), 1984 (19 goals).
 Top 33 players year-end list: four times.
 Grigory Fedotov club member.

International career
He earned 26 caps and scored 8 goals for the USSR national football team, and participated in the 1982 FIFA World Cup. He also won a bronze medal in football at the 1980 Summer Olympics, scoring a hat trick against Cuba.

External links
Profile (in Russian)

1956 births
Living people
Footballers from Luhansk
Ukrainian people of Russian descent
Ukrainian footballers
Soviet footballers
Soviet Union international footballers
1982 FIFA World Cup players
Olympic footballers of the Soviet Union
Footballers at the 1980 Summer Olympics
Olympic bronze medalists for the Soviet Union
Östers IF players
Mjällby AIF players
FC Rostov players
Russian Premier League players
Russian football managers
FC SKA Rostov-on-Don players
FC Zorya Luhansk players
FC Rostov managers
FC Chernomorets Novorossiysk managers
Soviet Top League players
Russian Premier League managers
Soviet expatriate footballers
Soviet expatriate sportspeople in Sweden
Expatriate footballers in Sweden
Expatriate football managers in Kazakhstan
FC SKA Rostov-on-Don managers
FC Atyrau managers
FK Vardar managers
Expatriate football managers in North Macedonia
Olympic medalists in football
Medalists at the 1980 Summer Olympics
Association football forwards
Allsvenskan players